State Route 430 (SR 430, OH 430) is an east–west state highway in the northern portion of Ohio. The western terminus of State Route 430 is at an interchange with State Route 309 in Ontario.  Its eastern terminus is at a T-intersection with State Route 603 just outside Mifflin.

Route description
This state highway runs through portions of Richland and Ashland Counties.  No part of State Route 430 is included as a part of the National Highway System.

History
State Route 430 follows part of what was previously US 30 through the Mansfield area. The section of SR 430 from its western terminus in Ontario at SR 309 to its split from US 42 in eastern Mansfield follows the original western end of US 30S, while the portion from US 42 to the eastern terminus at SR 603 just west of Mifflin was part of mainline US 30. State Route 430 was designated circa 1960 after US 30 was rerouted to its current location in the northern parts of Mansfield and Ontario and the western terminus of US 30S was changed to the what is now the junction of US 30 and SR 309. No changes of major significance have taken place to SR 430 since its inception.

Major intersections

References

External links

State Route 430 Endpoint Photos

430
Transportation in Richland County, Ohio
Transportation in Ashland County, Ohio